Temple of Rock is the debut album by the German hard rock band Michael Schenker's Temple of Rock.

Curiously, Schenker's tour for the record featured a setlist with very few tracks from the album, the setlists being primarily composed of old UFO material, as well as some older solo band material and Scorpions songs.

Track listing
All music by Michael Schenker, all lyrics by Michael Voss, except where indicated

 "Intro" - 1:12
 "How Long" - 3:56
 "Fallen Angel" - 4:10
 "Hanging On" - 4:01
 "The End of An Era" - 3:57
 "Miss Claustrophobia" - 4:47
 "With You" (Michael Schenker) - 4:45
 "Before the Devil Knows You're Dead" (Michael Schenker, Doogie White) - 4:39
 "Storming In" - 4:43
 "Scene of Crime" - 3:56
 "Saturday Night" - 3:28
 "Lover's Sinfony" (Michael Schenker, Robin McAuley) - 4:16
 "Speed" - 4:11
 "How Long (3 Generations Guitar-Battle Version)" - 5:50
 "Remember" - 2:32 (Japanese edition bonus track)
 "Miss Claustrophobia (Radio Edit)" - 3:36

Personnel

Band members
 Michael Schenker - guitars
 Michael Voss - vocals
 Wayne Findlay - keyboards
 Pete Way - bass
 Herman Rarebell - drums

Additional musicians
Vocals
William Shatner - spoken word on track 1
Robin McAuley - track 12
Doogie White - track 8

Guitars
Rudolf Schenker - tracks 4, 7
Michael Amott - track 14
Leslie West - track 14

Keyboards
Don Airey - track 5
Paul Raymond - tracks 4, 7

Bass
Chris Glen - tracks 9, 13
Neil Murray - tracks 2, 14
Elliott Dean Rubinson - tracks 4, 8, 15

Drums
 Carmine Appice - tracks 5, 15
 Simon Phillips - tracks 2, 14
 Chris Slade - tracks 9, 13
 Brian Tichy - track 8

Charts

References

2011 debut albums
Michael Schenker albums
King Records (Japan) albums